Tony Odur (born 7 December 1984) is a Ugandan footballer who last played for Katwe United in Uganda. Odur has also made appearances for the Uganda national football team. In March 2010 Odur scored a memorable hat trick against Burundi in CHAN qualifiers.

2014 CAF Champions League
 In CAF Champions League 2014, KCCA FC vs El Merriekih Tony Odur went on a score sheet with one goal and another one from teammate Herman Wasswa to secure an away win against the sudaneses based El Merriekih in the 1st leg, he also scored the only goal in the 2nd leg in which KCAA FC lost to El Merriekih at home, kampala, aggregate 3–2 in favour of KCCA FC.In CAF champions league 2014 Nkana vs KCCA FC, Odur scored a goal in the 26th in a game which end in 2–2 draw, and this made him the only player of KCCA to score in three games in CAF Champions league 2014 tournament.

2003 to present
Odur broke onto the scene in 2003 as an exciting youngster at Express FC. Together with the small Mark Mwambo, who has since quit the game, in midfield, they were the new kids on the block that came off the bench at the CECAFA club Championships that year to turn the game round.
The two were the talking points at that time and very exciting and at the end of that season, they helped Express win the Kakungulu Cup. But more sticking is the wonderful late equalizer Odur scored in the 2004 Kakungulu Cup final against KCC.

However, Odur's problems have been discipline. Faruuk Ssimbwa, formerly an administrator at Express between 2005 and 2007 told The Observer [Uganda newspaper] that Odur was as talented as he was insubordinate. “He was the kind of player who would at times want to hold the team at ransom if he wasn’t given what he wanted.”

It was one of the reasons he ended up quitting the team and joining Bunamwaya. He also had a professional trials stint in Denmark although he wasn't successful, and Tony had this to say “I need to get a shot at such an opportunity again and that’s why I’m working hard.”

In April 2014, Tony went to Vietnam to hally work on his dream of playing in others outside League, so he directed to Vietnam-based team, Sai Gon FC for trials April 2014. In 2014 Tony missed out a crucial match in Uganda Cup, semi finals against Sc victoria university at phillip omondi stadium, due to a knee injury but KCCF won the game 2-1

Achievements and honours

 Kakungulu Cup 2003 with Express FC
 CECAFA under-12 championship in Eritrea in 1997
 Fufa super league 2012/2013 with KCCA FC.
 Fufa super league 2013/2014 with KCCA FC

References

External links
 

1984 births
Living people
Ugandan footballers
Uganda international footballers
Association football midfielders
Expatriate men's footballers in Denmark
Express FC players
2011 African Nations Championship players
Kampala Capital City Authority FC players
Brabrand IF players
Vipers SC players
Ugandan expatriate footballers
Ugandan expatriate sportspeople in Zambia
Ugandan expatriate sportspeople in Denmark
Uganda A' international footballers
Nkana F.C. players